Delia Bennet (1892–1976) was an American artist. She is associated with the Gee's Bend quilting collective, and is said to be "the matriarch of perhaps the largest family of quilt producers in Gee's Bend." Her work is included in the collection of the Philadelphia Museum of Art.

Early life 
Born in 1892 to S.S. Pettway and Pleasant Pettway, Delia Bennett was raised on the Brown Plantation in Gee's Bend, Alabama. She married Eddie Bennett and they raised seven girls and four boys together. Bennett and her husband were subsistence farmers, growing food in their backyard. They were forced to grow cotton for free in exchange for living on the plantation grounds, which were owned by the Spurlin family in Camden, Alabama.

Exhibitions 

 2019 - Philadelphia Museum of Art included Bennett's quilt works in the exhibition Souls Grown Deep: Artists of the African American South

References 

1892 births
1976 deaths
20th-century American artists
20th-century American women artists
Quilters
African-American women artists
Artists from Alabama
20th-century African-American women
20th-century African-American people
20th-century African-American artists